The Jacksonville State Gamecocks softball team represents Jacksonville State University in NCAA Division I college softball. The team participates in the Ohio Valley Conference (OVC), but the current 2021 season is their last in that league. On JuJy 1 of that year, JSU will leave the OVC to join the ASUN Conference, a league in which it had been a member from 1995 to 2003. The Gamecocks are currently led by head coach Jana McGinnis. Coach McGinnis played basketball at JSU from 1987-1990. Assistant coaches are Mark Wisener  and Julie Boland. The team plays its home games at University Field located on the university's campus. The Gamecocks reached the NCAA Super Regionals in 2009. The Gamecocks beat the University of Tennessee to advance.

Year-by-year results

See also
List of NCAA Division I softball programs

References

External links